Mellonee Victoria Burnim (born 1950) is an American ethnomusicologist. A professor emerita at Indiana University who specializes in African American gospel music, she previously served as director of the university's Archives of African American Music and Culture.

Early life and education 
Burnim grew up in rural Teague, Texas, in the 1950s and 60s. She attended all-Black schools and churches, where she sang gospel music. By the age of 12, Burnim was the pianist for three different church choirs in her community.

Burnim attended North Texas State University, majoring in music education with a concentration in piano. During her studies, she continued to play piano for a Black Baptist church choir on Sundays. Burnim went on to complete a master's degree at the University of Wisconsin-Madison, with a thesis on songs in Mende folktales.

Burnim was recruited to Indiana University to complete her PhD and to found the university's African Choral Ensemble in 1976. She earned her doctorate in ethnomusicology in 1980, with a dissertation titled The Black Gospel Music Tradition: Symbol of Ethnicity.

Career 
Following her graduation, Burnim continued at Indiana University, joining the faculty of the Department of Afro-American Studies (now the Department of African American and African Diaspora Studies). She went on to chair the department. She transferred to the Department of Folklore and Ethnomusicology in 1999. She served as director of the Archives of African American Music and Culture from 2014 to 2016. As of 2017, Burnim holds professor emerita status.

Burnim is recognized as a pioneer and expert in the study of African American gospel music. She was a "prolific" researcher who published and lectured widely on the history and practice of Black religious music.

Burnim co-edited two textbooks with her Indiana University colleague Portia K. Maultsby: African American Music: An Introduction (2006) and Issues in African American Music: Power, Gender, Race, Representation (2016). A collection of Burnim's papers and audiovisual materials can be found in the Indiana University archives.

Selected works

Books 

African American Music: An Introduction (co-edited with Portia K. Maultsby), 2006. 
Issues in African American Music: Power, Gender, Race, Representation (co-edited with Portia K. Maultsby), 2016.

Journal articles

Book chapters

References 

1950 births
Living people
People from Freestone County, Texas
University of North Texas College of Music alumni
University of Wisconsin–Madison alumni
Indiana University alumni
Indiana University faculty
African-American women academics
American women academics
African-American academics
Ethnomusicologists
Academics from Texas
African-American music educators
American women musicologists
20th-century American musicologists
21st-century American musicologists
20th-century American non-fiction writers
21st-century American non-fiction writers
20th-century American women writers
21st-century American women writers
African-American women musicians
20th-century African-American women writers
20th-century African-American writers
21st-century African-American women writers
21st-century African-American writers